Kanniyakumari is a Tamil Nadu assembly constituency located in Kanniyakumari Lok Sabha Constituency in Kanyakumari district in Tamil Nadu. The constituency is located in the southern corner of mainland India, comprising the popular tourist destination Kanyakumari. In 2011 election, it had 237,410 total number of voters, consisting of 120,372 males and 117,038 females. Nadars formed the majority of the electorate. Kanyakumari will be one of 17 assembly constituencies to have VVPAT facility with EVMs in 2016 Tamil Nadu Legislative Assembly election.
It is one of the 234 State Legislative Assembly Constituencies in Tamil Nadu.

The Nadar community is the biggest community in this constituency with around 35% population.

The population of other communities are: Pillaimar 18%, Meenavar 14%, Paraiyar 14% and Muslims 3%.

The 2021 election winner Thalavai Sundaram of AIADMK party is a Pillaimar. He won with the support of Hindu Nadars who are backbone of BJP in this district. AIADMK and BJP were in alliance in 2021. Also substantial percentage of Meenavar (Fishermen) voted for AIADMK.

It is said that if the DMK had fielded a Hindu Nadar candidate, DMK would have won as Christian Nadars would have fully backed the DMK candidate. The Hindu Nadar candidate would have split the Hindu Nadar votes.

Since DMK fielded a Christian Nadar candidate, most of the Hindu Nadars stayed loyal to their BJP alliance and voted for AIADMK's Pillaimar candidate.

Konar, Chettiyar, Nair and such communities have some considerable population.

Travancore-cochin assembly

Madras State assembly

Tamil Nadu assembly

Election results

2021

2016

2011

2006

2001

1996

1991

1989

1984

1980

1977

1971

1967

1962

1957

1954 Agastheeswaram

1954 Thovala

1952

References 

 

Assembly constituencies of Tamil Nadu
Kanyakumari